Cafer Bater (1913–1994), born in Boyacikoy, Istanbul, was a prominent Turkish watercolor painter. Referred to as "one of the few watercolor painters in the country" by Celal Esat Arseven, a Turkish art professor and historian, Bater's watercolors include landscapes from Istanbul as well as scenes from France, Spain, Italy, and Egypt. His works were exhibited in many galleries at home and abroad and are in private collections as well as museums in Turkey. His work, Paris'te Kis (Winter in Paris), is in the Istanbul Resim ve Heykel Muzesi (Istanbul Museum of Painting and Sculpture). Bater is considered to be a member of the Watercolor Painters Group, a group which still exists though many of its members are deceased.

References

External links
 http://www.radikal.com.tr/1999/05/11/kultur/caf.html https://web.archive.org/web/20110713064221/http://www.istanbulsanatevi.com/sanat/ressam/ressam2_ist.php?action=sd&lang=tur&ressam=951

1913 births
1994 deaths
Turkish watercolourists
Artists from Istanbul
20th-century Turkish painters